Autostrada A54, also called tangenziale Ovest di Pavia, is a motorway tangent to the city of Pavia in its western part, managed by Milano Serravalle – Milano Tangenziali.

References

Transport infrastructure completed in 1994
1994 establishments in Italy
A54
Transport in Lombardy
Ring roads in Italy